Nicky Griffiths is a Welsh rugby union player. A scrum half, he is a former Wales Under-19, Under-21 and 7's international.

Griffiths started his career with Bridgend RFC before moving on the Ospreys, Cornish Pirates, Doncaster R.F.C. In June 2010 he joined Newport Gwent Dragons. He left Newport Gwent Dragons at the end of the 2010–11 season for Jersey
He has become a fans favourite at the island club scoring many tries and winning the Player's Player of the year award for 2013.

References

External links
Newport Gwent Dragons profile

1985 births
Bridgend RFC players
Doncaster R.F.C. players
Jersey Reds players
Living people
Dragons RFC players
Ospreys (rugby union) players
Rugby union players from Bridgend
Welsh rugby union players
Rugby union scrum-halves